"This Is Me Missing You" is a song co-written and recorded by American country music artist James House.  It was released in April 1995 as the third single from his album Days Gone By.  The song reached number 6 on the Billboard Hot Country Singles & Tracks chart in August 1995.  House wrote this song with Debi Cochran and Monty Powell.

Critical reception
Deborah Evans Price, of Billboard magazine reviewed the song favorably, saying that House "has a knack for packing emotion into every syllable of a lyric."

Music video
The theme of the video, directed by Steven Goldmann, is American soldiers keeping in contact with their families in their respective origins. The video was filmed in Fort Campbell, Kentucky and also uses stock footage of troops returning to base from the Gulf War.

Chart performance
"This Is Me Missing You" debuted at number 70 on the U.S. Billboard Hot Country Singles & Tracks for the week of April 29, 1995.

Year-end charts

References

1995 singles
James House (singer) songs
Songs written by James House (singer)
Song recordings produced by Don Cook
Music videos directed by Steven Goldmann
Epic Records singles
Songs written by Monty Powell
1995 songs